FVWM-Crystal is a theme framework for the FVWM window manager. It uses GUI tools to edit the look of windows, instead of the use of editing a text file in FVWM. It creates a desktop environment using FVWM as its window manager and main core.

It features flexible window decorations, and a file manager may be optionally used to display desktop icons; ROX-Filer, Thunar and Nautilus are supported for this task. FVWM-Crystal offers user interface integration for some terminal emulators like xterm, aterm and urxvt (rxvt-unicode), for a tray system such as stalonetray or trayer-srg, for various music players - among them Audacious, MPD, Quod Libet, XMMS and XMMS2 - and for the video/audio player MPlayer, to the point where it can control these components. FVWM-Crystal makes use of semi-transparency. Almost everything on the default desktop is semi-transparent. By additionally installing a utility program such as transset-df the semi-transparency can be switched on or off via pressing a determined key of the keyboard, being chosen in accordance with user's demands.

There is also a menu system that has an extensive default configuration but may be customized and extended by each user to fit personal requirements.

The deep-level configuration of the resulting desktop environment is predominantly achieved via Python scripts.

Chief developers of FVWM-Crystal are Maciej Delmanowski and Dominique Michel.

References

External links
 

Free desktop environments